Ambrogio Imperiale (Genoa, 1649 - Genoa, 1729) was the 145th Doge of the Republic of Genoa and king of Corsica.

Biography 
Ambrogio Imperiale held other public offices before the dogate, until the elections of October 4, 1719 which with a large majority consensus sanctioned his appointment as doge of Genoa, the hundredth in biennial succession and the one hundred and forty-fifth in republican history. As doge he was also invested with the related biennial office of king of Corsica. In his mandate, during 1721, the celebrations for the anniversary of the coronation of the Virgin Mary as queen of Genoa are remembered, an anniversary that took place every 25 years in Genoa. He ended his term on October 4, 1721. Suffering from Gout even before the dogal election, he died in Genoa in 1729.

See also 

 Republic of Genoa
 Doge of Genoa
 Imperiali family

References 

18th-century Doges of Genoa
1649 births
1729 deaths